Santiago Giraldo was the defending champion, but chose to not participate this year.

Brian Dabul won in the final 6-3, 6-2 against Nicolás Massú.

Seeds

Draw

Finals

Top half

Bottom half

External links
Draw

Challenger Salinas Diario Expreso - Singles
2010 Singles